Mount Dean is a mountain,  high, standing at the northeast end of the Quarles Range,  northeast of Mount Belecz. It was probably first seen by Roald Amundsen's polar party in 1911, and was first mapped by the Byrd Antarctic Expedition, 1928–30. It was named by the Advisory Committee on Antarctic Names for Jesse D. Dean, a meteorologist with the South Pole Station party of 1962.

References 

Mountains of the Ross Dependency
Amundsen Coast